Dasilva or DaSilva is a surname. Notable people with the surname include:

Dan DaSilva (born 1985), Canadian ice hockey player
Edgar J DaSilva (1941–2007), Indian microbiologist 
Jason DaSilva (born 1978), American documentary filmmaker
Jay Dasilva (born 1998), English footballer
Jon DaSilva, British record producer and DJ
Josh Dasilva (born 1998), English footballer
Marcos "Barrão" DaSilva (born 1961), Brazilian capoeira mestre
Raúl daSilva (born 1993), American filmmaker 
Steve DaSilva (born 1987), Canadian ice hockey player
Vicki DaSilva (born c. 1960), American artist

See also
Da Silva